Yucca baileyi is a plant in the family Agavaceae. It is native to Utah, Arizona, New Mexico and Colorado but has been cultivated elsewhere. Much of its native range is within the boundaries of the Navajo (Diné) Reservation, hence the common name "Navajo yucca." The Navajo people make extensive use of yucca fibers to make a wide assortment of useful and ceremonial items. They also use the roots as soap. It is not considered to be threatened, as it has a large range and an overall stable population.

Yucca baileyi is a relatively small species, usually acaulescent but sometimes with a short leafy stem. It can produce as many as 15 rosettes. Flowering stalk is up to 150 cm tall, with greenish-white to slightly purplish flowers.

References

External links

photo of herbarium specimen at Missouri Botanical Garden, Yucca baileyi collected near Santa Fe, New Mexico, in 1874
Plants Profile for Yucca baileyi (Navajo yucca), USDA

baileyi
Flora of the Southwestern United States
Plants described in 1913